The European Union's scientific collaboration beyond the bloc describes the European Union's frameworks for bilateral cooperation and specific projects in science and technology with countries and regional blocs situated beyond the European Union.

Types of association 
Since 1994, the European Union (EU) has signed international agreements for scientific and technological cooperation with 20 non-EU countries: Algeria, Argentina, Australia, Brazil, Canada, Chile, China, Egypt, India, Japan, Jordan, Rep. Korea, Mexico, Morocco, New Zealand, Russian Federation, South Africa, Tunisia, Ukraine and the USA.  For the European Parliament, ‘the science diplomacy aspect of this cooperation is emphasized at EU level to facilitate interactions with third countries, as well as to increase the EU's soft power’.

The EU invites countries beyond the bloc to participate in its seven-year framework programmes for research and innovation, including developing countries. Horizon Europe, the European Union's framework program for scientific research and innovation between 2021 and 2027, is the bloc's biggest research programme ever, with a budget of €95.5 billion. Horizon Europe aims to raise EU science spending levels by 50% during that period. It supports European partnerships in which the EU, national authorities and/or the private sector jointly commit to support the development and implementation of a programme of research and innovation activities. Horizon Europe expanded its partnerships beyond the 27 member states to include a number of European countries that are not EU member states as well as Israel.

Some countries are associated with the EU's framework programmes for research and innovation through a formal agreement. For Horizon 2020, this includes Iceland, Norway and Switzerland, Israel and countries at various stages of negotiations regarding their future accession to the EU, as in the case of several Southeast European countries (Albania, Bosnia and Herzegovina, Former Yugoslav Republic of Macedonia, Montenegro and Serbia) and both Moldova and Turkey. As part of its association agreement concluded with the EU in 2014, Ukraine has also formally become a Horizon 2020 partner.

A wider list of countries, including numerous developing ones, are in principle automatically eligible to submit research proposals through Horizon 2020 programmes. Association with the EU's framework programs can represent a significant contribution to the partner country's research volume and help it develop linkages with international networks of excellence. In turn, the EU has derived substantial benefit from the scientific talent of countries from the former Soviet bloc and elsewhere (e.g. Israel) through its framework programs.

Cooperation with countries beyond the bloc

European Free Trade Association 
The European Free Trade Association is an inter-governmental organization devoted to promoting free trade and economic integration in Europe. Its headquarters are in Geneva (Switzerland), but another office in Brussels (Belgium) liaises with the European Commission. Twelve years after EFTA was founded in 1960, it counted nine member states: Austria, Denmark, Finland, Iceland, Norway, Portugal, Sweden, Switzerland and the United Kingdom. All but three had joined the EU by 1995: Iceland, Norway and Switzerland. Liechtenstein's adhesion since 1991 brings EFTA's current membership to four.

A turning point in EFTA's development came with the signing of an agreement with the EU on the creation of a single European market. The Agreement on the European Economic Area (EEA) was signed by Iceland, Liechtenstein and Norway and entered into force in 1994. It provides the legal framework for the implementation of the four cornerstones of the single market: the free movement of people, goods, services and capital. The agreement established common rules for competition and state aid and promoted cooperation in key policy areas, including research and development (R&D). It is through this agreement that three of the four EFTA members (all but Switzerland) participate in the EU's main research activities as associated states on the same footing as the EU member states. Switzerland, on the other hand, must negotiate a bilateral cooperation agreement with the EU for each framework programme, as well as in areas such as trade in goods and services, and adhere to the four cornerstones of the single market. The four EFTA members thus do not have a unified legal and political status vis-à-vis the EU, which is why some refer to the ‘Norwegian Model’ and ‘Swiss Model’.

All four countries are involved in most of the European Commission's activities, as well as some other pan-European initiatives such as European Co-operation in Science and Technology (COST) and Eureka, a co-operative scheme providing companies, universities and research institutes with incentives for cross-border market-driven research. They also take part in the Bologna Process, the collective effort of European countries to harmonize and co-ordinate higher education.

Iceland, Liechtenstein and Norway 
The European Economic Area (EEA) agreement affords Iceland, Liechtenstein and Norway the status of fully associated partners in EU research programmes. Iceland and Norway take full advantage of this opportunity; they were among the most successful countries per capita for the obtention of competitive research grants from the Seventh Framework Programme over 2007–2013. For its part, Iceland had the best success rate of all European Research Area countries in the Cooperation programme of the seventh framework programme, which set out to strengthen research cooperation between universities, industry, research centres and public authorities across the EU and the rest of the world.

Participation in EU activities is not free. Besides paying a lump sum to each framework programme, the three EEA countries contribute to reducing socio-economic disparities in Europe by promoting social cohesion, via a special programme administered autonomously by the EEA Secretariat: the EEA/Norway grants programme. Although this is not really a research programme, education, science and technology play a crucial role in the areas covered by the programme, from environmental protection, renewable energy and the development of green industries to human development, better working conditions and the protection of cultural heritage.

Between 2008 and 2014, the three EEA donors invested €1.8 billion in 150 programmes that had been defined jointly with 16 beneficiary countries in central and southern Europe. In relation to climate change, for instance, one of the programme's priority themes, a joint project enabled Portugal to draw on the Icelandic experience to tap its geothermal potential in the Azores. Portugal has also co-operated with the Norwegian Institute for Marine Research to keep its seas healthy. Through another project, Innovation Norway and the Norwegian Water Resource and Energy Administration have helped Bulgaria to improve its energy efficiency and innovate in green industries.

The EEA grants/Norway grants programme will continue in the years to come, albeit with small changes to the programme structure, a likely increase in spending levels and a merger of the two types of grant into a single funding scheme. As in the past, Iceland and Norway are participating as fully associated members in Horizon 2020. Liechtenstein, on the other hand, has decided to refrain from an association with Horizon 2020, in light of the small number of scientists from this country and its resultant low participation level in the two former programmes.

Switzerland 
Switzerland was unable to sign the European Economic Area treaty, even though it had participated actively in drawing it up, owing to a negative vote in a Swiss referendum in November 1992. A bilateral agreement with the EU nevertheless allows Switzerland to take advantage of the main EU instruments in place, including the seven-year framework programmes for research and innovation, the Future and Emerging Technologies programme, the grants of the European Research Council and the Erasmus programme for student exchange,  in return for adhering to the 'four freedoms' of the single market, the freedom of movement of goods, services, people and capital. Switzerland's political ties to the EU are therefore more tenuous than those of the three other EFTA members.

Switzerland is the most successful country per capita in the calls for research proposals issued by the European Research Council. Moreover, one of its universities, the Ecole polytechnique fédérale de Lausanne, is leading the Human Brain Project, one of the two flagship projects of the Future and Emerging Technologies Programme, the other being the Graphene Project.

After the anti-immigration vote in a popular referendum in 2014, which flew in the face of one of the EU's four freedoms, the free movement of people (the others being the free circulation of goods, services and capital), there was some doubt as to whether Switzerland would continue to participate in Horizon 2020 after 2016.  Shortly after the vote, the Swiss government had informed the EU that it would be unable to give Croatian citizens unrestricted access to the Swiss job market, as this would be incompatible with the ‘yes’ vote in the referendum. The European Commission reacted by excluding Switzerland from research programmes potentially worth hundreds of millions of euros for its universities and suspended negotiations on Switzerland's participation as a full member of Horizon 2020. The European Commission also suspended Switzerland from the Erasmus student exchange programme. According to the ATS news agency, some 2 600 Swiss students took advantage of Erasmus in 2011 and Switzerland played host that same year to about 2 900 foreign students within the same EU-funded programme. The crisis was resolved after the Swiss parliament adopted a bill in December 2016 that gave priority to Swiss nationals and foreigners registered at Swiss job agencies but stopped short of introducing quotas on EU citizens.

Southeast Europe 
In July 2014, the remaining five non-EU countries in Southeast Europe (Albania, Bosnia and Herzegovina, Former Yugoslav Republic of Macedonia, Montenegro and Serbia), announced their decision to join the EU's Horizon 2020 programme, which succeeds the EU's Seventh Framework Programme for Research and Technological Development (2007–2013), in which they also participated. The relevant association agreements, which apply retroactively from 1 January 2014, allow entities from these five countries to compete for research funding under the Horizon 2020 programme.

Meanwhile, all are participating in a number of multilateral frameworks, including the European Cooperation in Science and Technology (COST) programme, which fosters co-operative networking by funding researchers’ participation in conferences, short-term scientific exchanges and the like. Another example is Eureka, a pan-European intergovernmental organization which fosters market-driven industrial R&D through a bottom-up approach that allows industry to decide which projects it wishes to develop.

Russian Federation 
Russian research centres and universities are participating in Horizon 2020 within international consortia, following fairly active participation in previous framework programmes. This co-operation is co-ordinated by a joint committee. In parallel, joint working groups have been set up to manage field-specific joint research calls that are cofinanced by the allied EU and Russian programmes.

A roadmap for establishing the EU–Russia Common Space for Research and Education is also currently being implemented, involving, inter alia, the stepping up of collaboration in space research and technologies. The Agreement for Co-operation between the European Atomic Energy Community and the Russian government in the field of controlled nuclear safety (2001) is currently in force. A joint declaration on the Partnership for Modernization was signed at the Russian Federation–EU summit in 2010.

The Russian Federation participates in a number of European research centres, including the European Organization for Nuclear Research (CERN) in Switzerland, the European Synchrotron Radiation Facility in France and European X-ray Free Electron Laser in Germany. It is a major stakeholder in several international megascience projects, including the ongoing construction of both the International Thermonuclear Experimental Reactor in France and the Facility for Antiproton and Ion Research in Germany. The Russian Federation also hosts the Joint Institute for Nuclear Research in Dubna, which employs over 1 000 researchers from the Russian Federation and further afield and receives nearly the same number of temporary foreign visitors each year.

In 2014, a wide array of activities were set in motion as part of the Russian–EU Year of Science. These include the launch of joint projects such as Interact (Arctic research), Supra (next-generation pilot simulators), Diabimmune (diabetic and auto-immune illness prophylactics) and Hopsa/Apos (efficient supercomputing for science and industry).

Even at the height of tensions over Ukraine, in 2014, the Agreement on Co-operation in Science and Technology was renewed for another five years by the European Commission and the Russian government. However, economic sanctions imposed on the Russian Federation by the EU in 2014 are limiting co-operation in certain areas, such as dual-use military technologies, energy-related equipment and technologies, services related to deep-water exploration and Arctic or shale oil exploration. The sanctions may ultimately affect broader scientific co-operation.

Black Sea basin 
One of the strategic goals of the Organization of the Black Sea Economic Cooperation (BSEC) is to deepen ties with the European Commission in Brussels. BSEC was founded in 1992, shortly after the disintegration of the Union of Soviet Socialist Republics, in order to develop prosperity and security in the region. It comprises 12 members: Albania, Armenia, Azerbaijan, Bulgaria, Georgia, Greece, Moldova, Romania, the Russian Federation, Serbia, Turkey and Ukraine.

The Council of Ministers of Foreign Affairs is the BSEC's central decision-making body. There is also a Parliamentary Assembly modelled on the Council of Europe and a Permanent International Secretariat, based in Istanbul. BSEC has a Business Council made up of experts and representatives of Chambers of Commerce from the member states and a Black Sea Trade and Development Bank which receives support from the European Investment Bank and the European Bank for Reconstruction and Development.

BSEC has adopted three Action Plans on Cooperation in Science and Technology (2005-2009, 2010-2014 and 2014–2018). The second Action Plan was funded on a project basis, since the plan had no dedicated budget. Two key projects funded by the European Union got underway in 2008 and 2009, namely the Scientific and Technological International Cooperation Network for Eastern European and Central Asian Countries (IncoNet EECA) and the Networking on Science and Technology in the Black Sea Region project (BS-ERA-Net). BSEC's second action plan targeted the development of physical and virtual multinational infrastructure by pooling the resources of BSEC member states, the networking of research institutes and universities in BSEC countries and their connection to the European gigabit.

BSEC's Third Action Plan on Science and Technology 2014-2018 acknowledges that considerable effort has been devoted to setting up a Black Sea Research Programme involving both BSEC and European Union members but also that, ‘in a period of scarce public funding, the research projects the Project Development Fund could support will decrease and, as a result, its impact will be limited. Additional efforts are needed to find a solution for the replenishment of the Project Development Fund’.

Having signed an association agreement with the EU as long ago as 1964, Turkey has been an Associated Country of the European Research Area and the EU's framework programmes for research and innovation for many years. It is also a member of COST and participates in Eureka.

Ukraine and the EU signed an agreement in 2010 which determined key thematic areas for co-operation: environmental and climate research, including observation of the Earth's surface; biomedical research; agriculture, forestry and fisheries; industrial technologies; materials science and metrology; non-nuclear power engineering; transport; information society technologies; social research; science and technology policy studies and training and the exchange of specialists. In March 2015, Ukraine signed an agreement with the EU for associate membership of Horizon 2020 with significantly more advantageous conditions on the table than previously, notably the possibility for Ukraine to participate in scientific co-operation at a fraction of the original cost.

The EU's association agreements signed with Georgia, Moldova and Ukraine in mid-2014 envisage enhancing these countries’ participation in Horizon 2020. Moldava had already signed an association agreement in 2012 for the previous framework programme.

Israel 
Israel has been associated with the EU's framework programmes on research and innovation since 1996. Between 2007 and 2013, Israeli public and private institutions contributed their scientific expertise to over 1 500 projects. Israel also participates in other EU programmes, such as those of the European Research Council or European Molecular Biology Laboratory.

Israel has been a Scientific Associate of the European Synchrotron Radiation Facility since 1999; the agreement was renewed in 2013 for a fourth term of five years and notably raised Israel's contribution from 0.5% to 1.5% of ESRF's budget.

Israel is also one of the ten founding members of the European Molecular Biology Laboratory, which dates from 1974. In 2012, the Weizmann Institute of Science, together with Tel Aviv University, was chosen as one of the seven core centres of the new Integrated Structural Biology Infrastructure (Instruct), joining prestigious institutions in France and Germany, Italy and the UK.

Israel has been selected as one of the seven nodes of the European Strategy Forum of Research Infrastructure, which is establishing about 40 such nodes in total, seven of them in biomedical sciences. The aim of the biomedical Instruct is to provide pan-European users with access to state-of-the-art equipment, technologies and personnel in cellular structural biology, to enable Europe to maintain a competitive edge in this vital research area.

Israel is also one of the nodes of Elixir, which orchestrates the collection, quality control and archiving of large amounts of biological data produced by life science experiments in Europe. Some of these datasets are highly specialized and were previously only available to researchers within the country in which they were generated.

Central Asia 
IncoNet CA was launched by the EU in September 2013 to encourage Central Asian countries to participate in research projects within Horizon 2020. The focus of the research projects is on three societal challenges considered as being of mutual interest to both the EU and Central Asia, namely: climate change, energy and health.

IncoNet CA builds on the experience of earlier EU projects which involved other regions, such as Eastern Europe, the South Caucasus and the Western Balkans. IncoNet CA focuses on twinning research facilities in Central Asia and Europe. It involves a consortium of partner institutions from Austria, the Czech Republic, Estonia, Germany, Hungary, Kazakhstan, Kyrgyzstan, Poland, Portugal, Tajikistan, Turkey and Uzbekistan. In May 2014, the EU launched a 24-month call for applications from twinned institutions – universities, companies and research institutes – for funding of up to €10 000 to enable them to visit one another's facilities to discuss project ideas or prepare joint events like workshops. The total budget within IncoNet CA amounts to €85 000.

The International Science and Technology Center (ISTC) was established in 1992 by the European Union (EU), Japan, the Russian Federation and the US to engage weapons scientists in civilian R&D projects and to foster technology transfer. ISTC branches have been set up in the following countries party to the agreement: Armenia, Belarus, Georgia, Kazakhstan, Kyrgyzstan and Tajikistan. The headquarters of ISTC were moved to Nazarbayev University in Kazakhstan in June 2014, three years after the Russian Federation announced its withdrawal from the centre.

Arab region 
Lebanon participates in a platform linking Mediterranean observatories of science, technology and innovation. This co-operative platform was set up by the Mediterranean Science, Policy, Research and Innovation Gateway (Med-Spring project) within the EU's Seventh Framework Programme for Research and Innovation (2007–2013). Med-Spring focused on three societal challenges: energy; high-quality affordable food; and the scarcity of resources. It sought to achieve policy objectives through the creation of a platform fostering dialogue and coordination among governmental bodies, research institutions, non-governmental organisations and civil society. Med-Spring involved the following countries: Algeria, Belgium, Cyprus, Egypt, France, Germany, Greece, Italy, Israel, Jordan, Lebanon, Malta, Morocco, Palestine, Portugal, Spain, Tunisia and Turkey.

In September 2013, ministers of research met in Morocco to lay the foundations for a common research policy between the five countries of the Maghreb and five countries of the Western Mediterranean: France, Italy, Malta, Portugal and Spain. These ten countries have met regularly since 1990 to discuss a wide range of issues, from security and economic co-operation to defence, migration, education and renewable energy but this was the first time that the 5+5 Dialogue, as the forum is known, had met to discuss research and innovation. In the Rabat Declaration adopted at this meeting, ministers undertake to facilitate training, technology transfer and scientific mobility by creating a specific visa for researchers. In parallel, the Maghreb countries are encouraged to join European research programmes as a first step towards harmonizing national policies and launching joint research projects.

Sub-Saharan Africa 
Initially framed within the Cotonou Agreement (2000) covering sub-Saharan, Caribbean and Pacific countries but excluding South Africa, the EU's co-operation with Africa is increasingly being organized in partnership with Africa's own frameworks for co-operation, in particular the African Union, as well as within the Joint Africa–EU Strategy adopted by African and European Heads of State at the Lisbon Summit in 2007. According to a progress report on implementation of this strategy, the EU's contribution of €14 million between 2007 and 2013 enabled the African Union Commission to design and launch two successive €7 million calls for proposals to support research in post-harvest agriculture, renewable and sustainable energy and water and sanitation. Twenty collaborative research projects were funded through this programme. The EU's Seventh Framework Programme for Research funded 565 collaborative research projects involving African participants. Altogether, some 1315 participants from 45 African countries had received a total of €178 million through the Seventh Framework Programme as of September 2013. Over the same period, the European Research Council allocated five grants to African researchers.

The ERAfrica initiative (2010–2014) funded by the Seventh Framework Programme has enabled European and African countries to launch joint calls for proposals in three thematic fields: Renewable Energy; Interfacing Challenges; and New Ideas; this has resulted in 17 collaborative research projects being backed by €8.3 million. Meanwhile, the Network for the Coordination and Advancement of sub-Saharan Africa–EU Science and Technology Cooperation Plus (CAAST-Net Plus, 2013–2016) focuses on food security, climate change and health, with the participation of 26 research organizations across both continents.

South Africa is the only African country which participates in the EU's Erawatch programme. One out of four of South Africa's almost 1 000 applications to the Seventh Framework Programme for research project funding was successful, representing a total of more than €735 million, according to the 2012 Erawatch report on South Africa.

African countries are expected to participate in Horizon 2020 through similar arrangements to those for the Seventh Framework Programme. By mid-2015, institutions from 16 African countries had reportedly obtained €5 million from Horizon 2020 in the form of 37 individual grants, the majority of which are related to climate change and health research. However, as of late 2015, African involvement in Horizon 2020 was lower than for the Seventh Framework Programme. According to the EU, this primarily reflects the need to set up national contact points in more African countries and to increase their capacity through supportive EU projects.

China 
China has enjoyed extensive co-operation with the EU ever since the signing of the EU–China Science and Technology Agreement in 1999. Relations have deepened, in particular, since the creation of the EU–China Comprehensive Strategic Partnership in 2003. During the Seventh Framework Programme, China was the EU's third-largest partner country (after the US and the Russian Federation) for the number of participating organizations (383) and collaborative research projects (274), particularly those focusing on health, environment, transportation, ICTs and the bio-economy.

Co-operation with China is significant for qualitative reasons, as many projects focus on frontier technologies, such as clean and efficient carbon capture. In addition to facilitating a convergence of views between researchers of different backgrounds, this co-operation has had some positive spillovers to other regions in complex cross-disciplinary areas, one example being the project for Advancing Universal Health Coverage in Asia over 2009–2013). The EU and China are also co-operating within Euratom via its fission programme and construction of the International Thermonuclear Experimental Reactor in France to further research into nuclear fusion. Between 2007 and 2013, nearly 4 000 Chinese researchers received funding through the Marie Curie Actions.

The EU intends for China to remain an important partner of Horizon 2020, even though China is no longer eligible for funding from the European Commission, meaning that EU and Chinese participants will be expected to secure funding themselves for their joint project proposals. The initial work programme (2014–2015) under Horizon 2020 will most likely focus on food, agriculture and biotechnology; water; energy; ICTs; nanotechnology; space; and polar research. China's co-operation with the Euratom Work Programme on topics related to fusion and fission is also expected to continue.

Southeast Asia 
The annual ASEAN–European Union Science, Technology and Innovation Days are reinforcing dialogue and co-operation between these two regional bodies. This annual forum was launched in 2014 within the Southeast Asia–EU Network for Biregional Co-operation project (SEA–EU NET II) funded by the EU's Seventh Framework Programme for Research and Innovation. A network designed to foster policy dialogue between the EU and the Pacific region has been launched within the same framework programme.

The second of these days took place in France in March 2015 and the third in Viet Nam in 2016. In 2015, the theme was Excellent Science in ASEAN. Some 24 exhibitors presented research from their institution or enterprise. There were also sessions on scientific topics and two policy sessions, one on the evolution of the ASEAN Economic Community and the second on the importance of intellectual property rights for the Pacific region.

South Pacific 
The Pacific–Europe Network for Science, Technology and Innovation (PACE-Net Plus) is funded by the European Commission within its Seventh Framework Programme for Research and Development (2007–2013). This project has spanned the period 2013–2016 and thus overlaps with the European Union's Horizon 2020 programme (2014–2020).

PACE–Net Plus sets out to reinforce the dialogue between the Pacific region and Europe, support biregional research and innovation through calls for research proposals and to promote scientific excellence and industrial and economic competition. Ten of its 16 members come from the Pacific region and the remainder from Europe.

The Pacific partners are the Australian National University, Montroix Pty Ltd (Australia), University of the South Pacific, Institut Malardé in French Caledonia, National Centre for Technological Research into Nickel and its Environment in New Caledonia, South Pacific Community, Landcare Research Ltd in New Zealand, University of Papua New Guinea, Samoa National University and the Vanuatu Cultural Centre.

The other six partners are: the Association of Commonwealth Universities, the Institut de recherche pour le développement in France, the Technical Centre for Agricultural and Rural Cooperation, a joint international institution of the African, Caribbean and Pacific Group of States and the European Union, the Sociedade Portuguesa de Inovação, United Nations Industrial Development Organization and Leibniz Centre for Tropical Marine Ecology in Germany.

PACE-Net Plus focuses on three societal challenges:
 health, demographic change and well-being;
 food security, sustainable agriculture, marine and maritime research and the bio-economy; and
 climate action, resource efficiency and raw materials.
A conference held in Suva (Fiji) in 2012 under the umbrella of PACE–Net Plus produced recommendations for a strategic plan for research, innovation and development in the Pacific. The conference report published in 2013 identified research needs in the Pacific in seven areas: health; agriculture and forestry; fisheries and aquaculture; biodiversity and ecosystem management; freshwater; natural hazards; and energy.

The conference also established the Pacific Islands University Research Network to support knowledge creation and sharing and to prepare succinct recommendations for the development of a regional policy framework for science, technology and innovation. This formal research network complements the Fiji-based University of the South Pacific, which has campuses in other Pacific Island countries.

Latin America 
Biregional scientific co-operation between the European Union and Latin America and the Caribbean dates back to the early 1980s, when the former Commission of the European Communities and the Andean Group Secretariat signed an agreement for co-operation and established a joint commission to oversee its implementation. Later, Europe concluded similar agreements with the Central American countries and Mercosur.

The sixth summit between the European Union and Latin America and the Caribbean in 2010 identified new pathways for biregional co-operation in the Madrid Declaration, which emphasized partnership in the areas of innovation and technology for sustainable development and social inclusion. The summit defined the long-term goal of achieving a common ‘knowledge area’ and agreed on a Joint Initiative for Research and Innovation.

Some 17 countries are participating in a key project within this initiative entitled ALCUE Net, which runs from 2013 to 2017; this project has established a joint platform for policy-makers, research institutions and the private sector from both regions in four thematic areas:
 information and communication technologies;
 the bio-economy;
 biodiversity and climate change; and
 renewable energies.

A second project with joint calls (ERANet LAC) is implementing projects in these four areas. There were €11 million available for the first call for project proposals (2014–2015) and a similar amount for the second call (2015–2016). The partners also carried out a foresight exercise in 2015 to build a common long-term vision for biregional co-operation.

Sources

References 

Foreign relations of the European Union